Darko Damjanović (born 5 November 1977) is a former Serbian-Swiss football goalkeeper.

He played 5 games in Swiss Super League in 2002–03 season.

In May 2010, he was given an open-ended suspension after involved in the 2009 European football betting scandal. His former teammate Marc Lütolf and Mario Bigoni were also banned.

During the winter break of the 2011/12 season he joined Serbian club FK Mačva Šabac.

References

External links
 

Swiss men's footballers
FC Wil players
FC Gossau players
Swiss Super League players
FK Mačva Šabac players
Association football goalkeepers
1977 births
Living people
Place of birth missing (living people)
Swiss people of Serbian descent
FC Kreuzlingen players